Lennep is a  ghost town and populated place in Meagher County, Montana, United States.

Lennep had a Lutheran church, general store, and post office. Located at the foot of the Castle Mountains, Lennep was once a station on the Old Milwaukee Road. The Lennep Mercantile housed the post office from the time the Mercantile opened in 1914; the post office had first opened in 1903 in a log home across the street. The post office was closed down in 1962.

Today Lennep is an abandoned, with a number of buildings remaining and in reasonable condition, including the old church and store. There are still residences in the vicinity of Lennep, but the site is unoccupied.

References

Ghost towns in Montana
Populated places in Meagher County, Montana